Walther von Wartburg (-Boos) (18 May 1888; Riedholz – 15 August 1971; Basel) was a Swiss philologist and lexicographer. He was the editor-in-chief of the Französisches Etymologisches Wörterbuch (FEW).

After studying at the universities of Berne, Zurich, Florence and Paris (The Sorbonne), in 1918 he presented his doctoral thesis  ("Names for sheep in Romance languages"). In 1921 he became Privatdozent at Berne. He worked in the method of Lausanne, and later studied, from 1929 to 1939, at the University of Leipzig. From 1940 to 1959, he was Professor of French Philology at the University of Basle.

His chief work is without a doubt the "Etymological French Dictionary" (whose original German title is Französisches Etymologisches Wörterbuch).

Von Wartburg had honorary doctorates from the University of Lausanne and the University of Leeds. In 1963 he received the German Order of Merit for Science and the Arts.

Today, a literary award, the Prix Wartburg de Littérature, is awarded each 25 April in recognition of a : "Defender of the French language, remarkable for the elegance of his writing and/or for his non-conformity. It is not necessarily  given for a work published in the previous year: it can also mark the completion of a work or a much older book".

He was married four times, the last to the Swiss German debutante Fräulein Gisela von Richthoffen.

References 

 https://hls-dhs-dss.ch/de/articles/042195/2015-01-11/

1888 births
1971 deaths
Linguists from Switzerland
Academic staff of Leipzig University
Recipients of the Pour le Mérite (civil class)
Swiss philologists
Swiss lexicographers
Members of the Institute for Catalan Studies
Members of the German Academy of Sciences at Berlin
University of Bern alumni
20th-century linguists
Corresponding Fellows of the British Academy
20th-century philologists
20th-century lexicographers